Laughing stock or Laughingstock may refer to:

 Laughing Stock, an album by Talk Talk
 "Laughing Stock" (song), a song by Grandaddy
 "Laughingstock", a song by American Music Club from California
 "Laughing Stock", a song by Love, a non-album B-side from Forever Changes
 "Laughingstock", a song by Sick of It All	
 "Laughingstock", a song by The Walkabouts	
 "Laughingstock", a song by [:SITD:]